Gustavo Warburg (born 7 August 1964) is an Argentine sailor. He competed in the men's 470 event at the 1992 Summer Olympics.

References

External links
 

1964 births
Living people
Argentine male sailors (sport)
Olympic sailors of Argentina
Sailors at the 1992 Summer Olympics – 470
Place of birth missing (living people)